Rhome  is a city in Wise County, Texas, United States. Its population was 1,630 in 2020. It is also the home of Eli Miller.

Rhome has a large, 12-plaque war exhibit located at Veterans Memorial Park, in a residential area east of the downtown.

Geography

Rhome is located at  (33.078895, –97.493199).

Demographics

As of the 2020 United States census, 1,630 people, 529 households, and 408 families were residing in the city.

References

External links

Cities in Wise County, Texas
Cities in Texas
Dallas–Fort Worth metroplex